This list outlines the names of notable film actors of ethnic Tamil origin. The names are ordered by the actors' first or stage name.

Actors 

 Ajith Kumar (Half Tamil)
 Aari Arujunan
 Akhil
 Appukutty
 Arun Vijay
 Arvind Swamy
 Ashok Selvan
 Ashwin Kakumanu
 Attakathi Dinesh
 Aziz Ansari 
 Besant Ravi
 Bharani
 Bharath
 Bonda Mani
 Ceylon Manohar
 Chaams
 Crane Manohar
 Darshan Dharmaraj
 Dhamu
 Dhanush
 Dhruv Vikram (Half Tamil)
 Ennathe Kannaiah
 G. Ramanathan
 G.Srinivasan
 Ganja Karuppu
 Gautham Karthik
 Gemini Ganesan 
 Goundamani
 Gowtham Sundararajan
 Gundu Kalyanam
 Harish Kalyan
 Idichapuli Selvaraj
 Ilavarasu
 Imman Annachi
 J. Livingston
 Jai 
 Jai Akash
 Jaishankar
 Janagaraj
 Jay Chandrasekhar 
 Jayam Ravi (Half Tamil)
 Jayaram
 Jiiva (Half Tamil)
 K. Balaji
 K. Sarangapani
 K.A. Thangavelu
 K. K. Soundar
 K. R. Ramasamy
 Kalaiyarasan
 Kali N. Rathnam
 Kamal Haasan 
 Karthi 
 Karthik
 Karunas
 Kathir
 Kreshna
 Kullamani
 LIC Narasimhan
 Loose Mohan
 M. K. Radha
 M. K. Thyagaraja Bhagavathar
 M. S. Bhaskar
 Manivannan
 Major Sundararajan
 Murali (Half Tamil)
 N. S. Krishnan
 Nandha Durairaj
 Nassar
 Nizhalgal Ravi
 Omakuchi Narasimhan
 P. S. Veerappa
 P. U. Chinnappa
 Pandiyan
 Pandiarajan
 Pandu
 Pasi Narayanan
 Pasupathy
 Ponnambalam
 Poornam Viswanathan
 Pradeep Ranganathan
 Prabhu
 Prasanna   
 Prashanth (Half Tamil)
 Pugazh
 Pyramid Natarajan
 R. Madhavan
 R. Muthuraman
 R. K. Suresh 
 R. S. Manohar
 Rahul Ravindran
 Rajesh (actor)
 Ramarajan
 Ramesh Aravind
 Ramki
 Ravichandran
 Rajendran
 Rishi (Tamil actor) 
 S.A. Ashokan 
 S.J. Suryah
 S. S. Rajendran
 S. V. Ramadas
 S. V. Sahasranamam
 S. V. Venkataraman
 Samuthirakani
 Santhanam
 Sarathkumar
 Saravanan
 Sasikumar
 Sathyaraj
 Selva Rasalingam (Half Tamil)
 Sendhil Ramamurthy (Half Tamil)
 Seeman
 Senthil
 Shaam 
 Shiva 
 Sibiraj 
 Siddharth (actor) 
 Silambarasan
 Sivakarthikeyan
 Sivaji Ganesan
 Sivakumar
 Soori
 Sri
 Srikanth (Half Tamil)
 Suriya 
 Suruli Rajan
 Swaminathan 
 T. Rajendar
 T. R. Ramachandran
 T. S. Balaiah
 Teejay Arunasalam
 Thambi Ramaiah
 Thengai Srinivasan
 V. Gopalakrishnan (actor)
 V. Ravichandran
 V. K. Ramaswamy
 V. I. S. Jayapalan 
 V. S. Raghavan
 Vadivelu
 Vennira Aadai Moorthy
 Vidharth
 Vignesh
 Vimal
 Vijay 
 Vijay Antony 
 Vijay Sethupathi
 Vijayakumar
 Vikram
 Vikram Prabhu
 Vikranth 
 Vivek
 Vivek Oberoi (Half Tamil)
 Yogi Babu

Actresses 
* Abhirami
 Adah Sharma
 Amara Karan 
 Ammu Abhirami
 Athulya Ravi
 Chandini Tamilarasan (Half Tamil)
 Charithra Chandran
 C. R. Vijayakumari
 C.T.Rajakantham 
 Dhansika
 Disco Shanthi
 E. V. Saroja
 Esha Deol (Half Tamil)
 Gayathrie 
 Ganthimathi
 Hema Malini
 Geraldine Viswanathan (Half Tamil)
 Indhuja Ravichandran
 Jangiri Madhumitha
 Joshna Fernando
 Janani Iyer
 K. Thavamani Devi
 K. B. Sundarambal
 Kalpana Iyer
 Kanika
 Keerthy Suresh (Half Tamil)
 Kruthika Jayakumar
 Kumari Rukmani
 Kutty Padmini
 Lakshmi (actress) (Half Tamil)
 Lakshmi Priyaa Chandramouli
 Lakshmy Ramakrishnan
 Lalitha Kumari
 M. N. Rajam
 M. S. Subbulakshmi
 Maitreyi Ramakrishnan
 Malavika Avinash
 Manochitra
 Manorama
 Meena. (Half Tamil)
 Meenakshi Seshadri
 Meera Vasudevan
 Menaka
 Mindy Kaling 
 Mrudhula Bhaskar
 Myna Nandhini
 N. C. Vasanthakokilam
 Niranjani Shanmugaraja
 Nivetha Pethuraj
 P. A. Periyanayaki
 Padma Lakshmi
 Padmapriya Janakiraman
 Pearle Maaney. (Half Tamil)
 Poornima Bhagyaraj
 Poornima Indrajith
 Priya Anand (Half Tamil) 
 Priyanka Arul Mohan (Half Tamil)
 Priya Bhavani Shankar
 Priyamani
 Preetha Vijayakumar
 Rathi Arumugam
Ramya Krishnan
 Ranjitha
 Regina Cassandra
 Rekha. (Half Tamil)
 Rukmani Devi
 Rukmini Vijayakumar
 Rupa Manjari
 Riythvika
 S. N. Lakshmi
 Shanthi Krishna
 Sanchana Natarajan
 Sathyakala
 Sathyapriya
 Sabby Jey
 Shammu
 Sheela Rajkumar
 Shruti Hassan (Half Tamil)
 Simone Ashley 
 Srividya
 Sridevi (Half Tamil)
 Sridevi Vijayakumar
 Sripriya 
 Sruthi Hariharan
 Sukanya
 Suhasini Mani Ratnam
 Sumathi
 Swarnamalya
 Tanya Ravichandran
 Trisha Krishnan
 T. A. Madhuram
 T. R. Rajakumari
 T. P. Rajalakshmi
 T. V. Rathnam
 Tharini Mudaliar
 V. N. Janaki (Half Tamil)
 Vadivukkarasi
 Vasundhara Devi
 Vasundhara Kashyap (Half Tamil)
 Vidya Balan
 Vijayalakshmi Agathiyan
 Vyjanthimala

Footnotes 

Tamil
 
Tamil actors